This article contains information about the literary events and publications of 1534.

Events
July 20 – Cambridge University Press is granted a royal charter by King Henry VIII of England to print "all manner of books" and becomes the first of the privileged presses.
unknown dates
Luther Bible: Martin Luther's Biblia: das ist die gantze Heilige Schrifft Deudsch, a translation of the complete Bible into German is printed by Hans Lufft in Wittenberg, including woodcut illustrations.
Rabbi Asher Anchel's Mirkevet ha-Mishneh (a Tanakh concordance) becomes the first book printed in Yiddish (in Kraków).

New books
Anthony Fitzherbert – La Novelle Natura Brevium
François Rabelais (as Alcofribas Nasier) – Gargantua (La vie très horrifique du grand Gargantua, père de Pantagruel)
Polydore Vergil – Historia Anglica
Juan Luis Vives – De conscribendis epistolis
Syed Shah Israil – Maʿdan al-Fawāʾid in Persian

Poetry

Births
April 18 – William Harrison, clergyman and writer (died 1593)
October 18 – Jean Passerat, poet and satirist (died 1602)

Deaths
November 23 – Otto Brunfels, German botanist and theologian (born 1488)
Unknown dates
Cesare Magni, Italian printer
Wynkyn de Worde, Lotharingian-born English printer

References

1534

1534 books
Renaissance literature
Early Modern literature
Years of the 16th century in literature